Kalmadan-e Naqib (also Romanized as Kalmadān-e Naqīb; also known as Galmadān, Kalmeyn, Kalmīdān, and Kelemeydān) is a village in Feyziyeh Rural District, in the Central District of Babol County, Mazandaran Province, Iran. At the 2006 census, its population was 287, in 77 families.

References 

Populated places in Babol County